Obongsan is a mountain of North Korea. It has an elevation of 1,180 metres It stands between Changgang County and Hwapyong County in Chagang Province.

See also
List of mountains of Korea

References

Mountains of North Korea